Harald Ramsfjell (born 20 July 1957) is a Norwegian curler.

Teams

References

External links
 

Living people
1957 births
Norwegian male curlers